Inchicronan Priory  (Irish: Prióireacht Inse Chrónáin is an early monastic site, possibly founded 6th century by patron, St Cronan of Tuamgraney Crusheen.

The abbey was refounded about 1198AD by Donald O'Brien, (King of Limerick), as a daughter house of Clare Abbey.

It became a parish church in 1302AD and was dissolved c.1543 by Henry VIII, but it was restored and in use by 'friars' in the reign of Elizabeth I
and became a parish church again in 1615 when Donogh, Earl of Thomond; granted it to Henry, Earl of Thomond.

References

Christian monasteries established in the 7th century
7th-century churches in Ireland